The National Archives of Madagascar are the national archives of Madagascar. It holds 30,000 volumes.

See also 
 Unesco Memory of the World Register – Africa
 National Library of Madagascar
 List of national archives

References 

Madagascar
History of Madagascar
Buildings and structures in Antananarivo